Facundo Bagnis was not the defending his title.

Thiemo de Bakker won the title, defeating James Duckworth in the final, 4–6, 7–6(12–10), 6–1.

Seeds

  Denis Kudla (second round)
  Facundo Argüello (quarterfinals)
  Guido Andreozzi (first round)
  Wayne Odesnik (quarterfinals)
  James Duckworth (final)
  Lucas Pouille (first round)
  Renzo Olivo (first round)
  Andrea Collarini (second round)

Draw

Finals

Top half

Bottom half

References
 Main Draw
 Qualifying Draw

Challenger ATP Cachantun Cup - Singles
2014 - Singles